Nalanda University is a public central located in Nalanda district's Rajgir in the state of Bihar, India. It is  designated as an Institute of National Importance (INI) and excellence. The international university supported by 18 member countries was established by an Act of the Indian Parliament in 2010. The decision to set up the university was endorsed at the second and fourth East Asia Summits. The President of India serves as Visitor to the university.

History
Nalanda University was established to emulate the ancient university of Nalanda, which functioned between the 5th and 13th centuries. The idea to resurrect Nalanda University was endorsed in 2007 at the 2nd East Asia Summit by the sixteen member countries. In 2009, during the 4th East Asia summit, ASEAN member states including Australia, China, Korea, Singapore and Japan promised further support. The State Government of Bihar handed over land acquired from local people, to the university for its new campus. Chief Minister of Bihar Nitish Kumar also met External Affairs Minister SM Krishna to receive reassurance that the Central Government would allocate sufficient funds to the project.

The architectural design was chosen on the basis of a global competition. The jury consisting of architects including Liu Thai Ker chose Pritzker Prize laureate BV Doshi's firm, Vastu Shilpa Consultants as the winner of the design competition. The firm dbHMS provides the triple net zero energy, water and waste strategic plan. Original concepts associated with the project included "advancing the concept of an Asian community...and rediscovering old relationships." and "acting as a bridge for students in different parts of Southeast Asia".

The university has been envisioned as an international institution of national importance and excellence. It began its first academic session on 1 September 2014 with 15 students in the School of Historical Studies and the School of Ecology and Environmental studies. A hotel operated by Bihar State Tourism Development Corporation in Rajgir provided initial hostel accommodation. The university started functioning from its 455-acres new campus from January 2020. At least 200 villages surrounding the university will be attached to the university, reminiscent of the old Nalanda.

Nalanda University Act
On 28 March 2006 the eleventh President of India A. P. J. Abdul Kalam proposed the idea while addressing the Joint Session of the Bihar Vidhan Mandal for the revival of Nalanda University. In 2007 the Bihar Legislative Assembly passed a bill for the creation of a new university.

The Nalanda University Bill, 2010 was passed on 21 August 2010 in Rajya Sabha and 26 August 2010 in Lok Sabha. The bill received Presidential assent on 21 September 2010 thereby becoming an Act. The university came into existence on 25 November 2010, when the Act was implemented.

Governance 
The university's visitor is the President of India. The chancellor and chairperson of the governing board is Vijay Bhatkar. The vice-chancellor is Sunaina Singh. The governing board comprises the chancellor, vice-chancellor, representative from member countries, a secretary, two representatives from the Government of Bihar, a representative from the Ministry of Human Resource Development, and three persons in the category of "Renowned Academician or Educationist", Arvind Sharma, Lokesh Chandra and Arvind Panagariya.

The first chancellor of the university was Amartya Sen, followed by former Singapore Minister for Foreign Affairs George Yeo. They left citing concerns about autonomy and political interference in academic matters. Vijay Pandurang Bhatkar has been appointed the new chancellor on 25 January 2017 by President Pranab Mukherjee, in his capacity as Visitor to Nalanda University. In 2017, Interim Vice-Chancellor Pankaj Mohan handed over charge to Professor Sunaina Singh as permanent vice-chancellor.

Schools and centres 
Nalanda is exclusively a graduate school, currently offering master's courses, and doctor of philosophy programmes.

Nalanda University has five functional Schools at present:
 School of Historical Studies
 School of Ecology and Environmental Studies
 School of Buddhist Studies, Philosophy and Comparative Religion
 School of Languages and Literature/Humanities
School of Management Studies

The following schools are planned to start later, in a phased manner:
 School of International Relations and Peace Studies
 School of Information Sciences and Technology
 School of Business Management (Public Policy and Development Studies)
Three centres — Centre for Bay of Bengal, Centre for Conflict Resolution and Peace Building, and Common Archival Resource Centre— will be operational soon.

The School of Languages and Literature/Humanities commenced its operations with one year Post-Graduate Diploma Programmes in Pali, Sanskrit, Tibetan, Korean and English in 2018. Master's and doctoral programmes commenced in 2021. It is planned to gradually expand to include other programmes in Indian and foreign languages.

See also 
 Education in Bihar
 Institutes of National Importance
 International university

References

Further reading

External links

Universities in Bihar
2014 establishments in Bihar
Educational institutions established in 2014
Postgraduate schools
Education in Nalanda district
Nalanda
Rajgir
Central universities in India